Eftimios Youakim, BS, (born on 15 June 1886 in Qaytuleh – died on 19 May 1972) was an Archbishop of the Melkite Greek Catholic Archeparchy of Zahle and Forzol in Lebanon.

Life

On 25 March 1912 Youakim was ordained priest and appointed Chaplain of the Melkite Basilians of the Most Holy Redeemer. The appointment as bishop of Zahle and Fourzol took place on October 30, 1926. The Patriarch of Antioch Cyril IX Moghabghab consecrated him bishop on 9 December 1926. With the elevation of the bishopric of Zahle and Fourzol in 1964 to Archdiocese Youakim was appointed archbishop. After his age-appropriate retirement on 21 August 1971, he was appointed Titular Archbishop of Scythospolis. Youakim participated from 1962 to 1965 in all sessions of the Second Vatican Council. He was co-consecrator of Archbishop Saba Youakim, BS, of Petra and Philadelphia in Jordan. He was succeeded by Archbishop Jean Bassoul, BS.

See also 
Catholic Church in Lebanon

References

External links
 http://www.catholic-hierarchy.org/bishop/byoua.html 

1886 births
1972 deaths
Lebanese Melkite Greek Catholics
Melkite Greek Catholic bishops